The Joint Committee of Light Metal Trades Unions (LMTU) was a trade union committee consisting of unions based in the United Kingdom with members involved in producing castings for industry and construction.

The committee was established in 1911, as the Joint Committee of the Light Castings Trade Unions, adopting its final name in about 1930.  It negotiated with the National Metal Trades Federation, which represented companies which produced castings.

The committee was based in Rotherham, sharing its offices and general secretary with the National Union of Domestic Appliance and General Metal Workers.

By the 1980s, the committee had the following members:
 Amalgamated Society of Boilermakers, Shipwrights, Blacksmiths and Structural Workers
 Amalgamated Union of Engineering Workers (Engineering, Foundry and TASS sections)
 Association of Patternmakers and Allied Craftsmen
 Association of Professional, Executive, Clerical and Computer Staff
 National Union of Domestic Appliance and General Metal Workers
 National Union of Sheet Metal Workers, Coppersmiths and Heating and Domestic Engineers
 Transport and General Workers' Union (Vehicle Building Automotive Group)

References

Defunct trade unions of the United Kingdom
Metal trade unions
1911 establishments in the United Kingdom
Trade unions established in 1911
Trade unions based in South Yorkshire